Clinton Wesley Morgan (born July 23, 1950) is an American businessman and politician from the state of Kentucky. A member of the Republican Party, Morgan is a former member of the Kentucky House of Representatives for the 81st district.

Early life and career
Morgan grew up in Leslie County, Kentucky. He graduated from Leslie County High School, Cumberland College, and Eastern Kentucky University.

After working as a criminal investigator for the Bureau of Alcohol, Tobacco & Firearms as a young man, Morgan returned to Richmond, Kentucky, and opened a liquor store in 1982. Eventually, he opened a large business called Liquor World and became wealthy. He expanded Liquor World into a chain of four stores.

Political career
Morgan ran for the Kentucky House of Representatives in the 81st district in the 2014 elections. He lost to Democrat Rita Smart, the incumbent. In November 2016, buoyed by strong local support for Donald Trump, Morgan defeated Smart, receiving 9,056 votes to 8,980 for Smart, a margin of just 76 votes.

Early in his single term, Morgan was criticized for introducing legislation that would have benefitted the liquor industry. Democratic legislators criticized Morgan for introducing bills that would have immunized drivers who hit protesters in roads and would have allowed teachers to carry guns at school.

Morgan clashed with Republican leaders as well. In November 2017, he called for the resignation of Republican Jeff Hoover, Speaker of the Kentucky House of Representatives, after the news emerged that Hoover had secretly settled a sexual harassment case brought by a female staffer.
 Hoover resigned as speaker, but kept his house seat.

Morgan lost renomination to the Kentucky House to Deanna Frazier in the 2018 elections. Upset with his defeat, Morgan endorsed the Democratic nominee in the race. Morgan unsuccessfully ran for the Republican nomination in the 2020 U.S. Senate election in Kentucky against Mitch McConnell, placing second with 6.2% of the vote. During the campaign, he denounced McConnell as a "deep-state traitor" and praised what he called the "patriots" of QAnon.

Personal life
Morgan and his first wife had a daughter, Jordan. He and his second wife, Lindsey, have a daughter named Sydney.

Mansion
In 2009, convinced that the presidency of Barack Obama would lead the country to social breakdown, civil war, and "roving bands of gangs", Morgan purchased  of land near Richmond and built a  house with nine bedrooms and three kitchens.

After his defeat in the 2020 U.S. Senate primary, Morgan decided to sell his house and leave Kentucky. He listed his house for $6.5 million on Zillow. The listing went viral and attracted unwanted attention and criticism because of the underground survival bunker. On the night of February 22, 2022, an intruder climbed to a second-floor balcony, broke into the house, and killed Morgan's 32-year-old daughter Jordan in her bed. The man then shot Morgan in the arm; Morgan returned fire with a pistol, but the intruder escaped. He was arrested several days later and charged with murder and attempted murder. The suspect was described as a former soldier with psychiatric problems who had intended to take control of the underground bunker. As of December 2022, Morgan's home was still up for sale at $6.5 million.

References

External links

Living people
People from Hyden, Kentucky
People from Richmond, Kentucky
Eastern Kentucky University alumni
University of the Cumberlands alumni
Republican Party members of the Kentucky House of Representatives
1950 births
Candidates in the 2020 United States Senate elections
21st-century American politicians